Aeroexpress Ltd. is the operator of airport rail link services in  Russia. It is founded in 2005 and is owned by Russian Railways (50%), TransGroup AS (25%), Iskander Makhmudov (17.5%), and Andrei Bokarev (7.5%).
Until 2012, the company only provided the rail transportation services between Moscow rail terminals and Moscow airports (Sheremetyevo, Domodedovo, and Vnukovo). The company previously also provided the rail link services to Kazan's Kazan International Airport, Sochi's Adler Airport, and Vladivostok's Knevichi Airport.

In 2012, Aeroexpress transported 17.4 million passengers.

History

The first rail link connected Moscow and Sheremetyevo Airport in 2002. In May 2008, Aeroexpress began to provide the rail link between Moscow and Vnukovo Airport (the line opened in August 2005).

In February 2012, the service on the first non-Moscow link, connecting Sochi with its airport, began operations, followed in late July by a similar link in Vladivostok and, in 2013, Kazan. On its Vladivostok route the company also offered a limited commuter service at discounted prices. Services on routes outside Moscow were handed to other companies in early 2015 due to heavy losses and the "current macroeconomic situation".

Rolling stock

Current

Bus Fleet

Retired

Routes list

Aeroexpress routes

 Moscow, Paveletsky Rail Terminal - Aeroport Domodedovo (Domodedovo Airport) via Verkhnie Kotly railway station 
 Moscow, Kievskiy Rail Terminal - Aeroport (Vnukovo Airport)
 Moscow, Belorussky Rail Terminal - Sheremetyevo (Sheremetyevo Airport (Terminals D, E, F)) via Okruzhnaya railway station (Aeroexpress announced that it will change the terminus for this line from Belorussky to Savyolovsky Terminal. The company did not set a date for the change, but expects it to occur in 2019.)

Aeroexpress Bus Service Routes 
 Moscow, Khovrino Metro Station/"Severniye Vorota" Bus Terminal - Sheremetyevo Airport (Terminals A, B, C)

Future Routes 
Novosibirsk, Novosybirsk-Glavny Rail Terminal - Aeroport Tolmachevo (Tolmachevo Airport) (before 2025)
St. Petersburg, Vitebsky Rail Terminal - Aeroport Pulkovo (Pulkovo Airport) (EIS 2022, construction to commence in 2018)

Former routes
 Kazan, Kazan–Passazhirskaya Rail Terminal - Kazan International Airport: Handled to "Sodruzhestvo" since January 2015.
 Sochi, Sochi Rail Terminal - Sochi International Airport: Handled to Russian Railways since June 2015.
 Vladivostok - Vladivostok Airport (Knevichi railway station): Handled to "Express Primorya" since January 2015.

"REX" routes (handled to "CPPK")
 Moscow, Savelovskiy Rail Terminal - Lobnya
 Moscow, Belorussky Rail Terminal - Mozhaysk
 Moscow, Kazansky Rail Terminal - Golutvin
 Moscow, Yaroslavsky Rail Terminal - Pushkino
 Moscow, Yaroslavsky Rail Terminal - Fryazino
 Moscow, Yaroslavsky Rail Terminal - Monino
 Moscow, Paveletsky Rail Terminal - Ozherelye

International cooperation
Aeroexpress is a member of the International Air-Rail Organisation (IARO). Aeroexpress has taken into consideration the experience, quality standards and spectrum of services provided by its colleagues in Germany, UK, Sweden and US.

Recent news
In January 2015, Moscow Department of Transport expressed initiative to transfer the Aeroexpress terminal from Belorussky to Savelovsky Railway Station. However, citizens voted against this proposal. In May 2013, Aeroexpress announced it intends to decrease the headway between consecutive trains in Moscow to 15 minutes over the next few years. Currently, the headway between consecutive trains is 30 minutes. In February 2013, Aeroexpress ordered 25 double decker electro-motor units. The first train was delivered from Switzerland in August 2014.

References

External links

 
 Aeroexpress 
 Russian Railways 
 TransGroup AS 
 Domodedovo International Airport 
 Sheremetyevo International Airport 
 Vnukovo International Airport 
 Paveletsky Rail Terminal 
 Belorussky Rail Terminal 
 Savyolovsky Rail Terminal 
 Kievsky Rail Terminal 
 International Air Rail Organisation 

Transport in Moscow
Railway lines opened in 2002
Railway companies of Russia
Airport rail links
Vnukovo International Airport
Companies based in Moscow
Russian Railways